The Buffalo Stallions were a soccer team based out of Buffalo, New York, that played in the Major Indoor Soccer League from 1979 to 1984.  Their home arena was Buffalo Memorial Auditorium. It was the last professional club for which the Portuguese legend and FIFA 100 forward Eusébio played, in 1979–1980.

The games were broadcast on radio for at least two seasons.  Veteran Buffalo sportscaster Van Miller called the play by play the first season on 104.1 FM, then WACJ.  Jim Lane called the shots in the second season.

Players
 Eusébio 1979-80
 Chris Vranceanu 1983-84
 Rudy Pikuzinski 1983-84
 Robert Prentice 1984
 Edward Kennedy 1984
 Jim May 1980-1985
 Lajos Kű 1980-1981

History

Accomplishments

1979–1980 – All-MISL Team – Ian Anderson
1979–1980 – MISL Rookie of the Year – Jim Sinclair
1981–1982 – MISL Rookie of the Year – Germain Iglesias

References

Sports in Buffalo, New York
Defunct indoor soccer clubs in the United States
Major Indoor Soccer League (1978–1992) teams
Men's soccer clubs in New York (state)
1979 establishments in New York (state)
1984 disestablishments in New York (state)
Association football clubs established in 1979
Association football clubs established in 1984